Ubajara is a municipality in the state of Ceará in the Northeast region of Brazil.

In this municipality is located the Ubajara National Park.

See also
List of municipalities in Ceará

References

Municipalities in Ceará